Bheja Fry is a series of Indian comedy films written and directed by Sagar Ballary and starring Vinay Pathak.

Overview

Bheja Fry (2007)

Ranjeet Thadani (Rajat Kapoor) is a music producer married to Sheetal (Sarika) a singer. Ranjeet and his friends get together every Friday for a party. This is a different kind of party where they invite idiots to ridicule them behind the scenes and calling them "talent". They enjoy doing it so much that they don't even mind missing out on family appointments.

One of Ranjeet's friends meets Bharat Bhushan (Vinay Pathak), an inspector for the income tax department, on a trip to Pune and decides that he could probably be a source of entertainment for Ranjeet. Ranjeet promptly calls Bharat and invites him for dinner.

Bharat is a talkative self-promoting singer who carries with him a scrap book showcasing his musical life. He is excited at the prospect of meeting a music producer which might help advance his career as a singer. Bharat is kind-hearted and wants to help everyone but he also has the ability to mess things up for people around him. He can be annoying to the person who is sitting next to him but he makes it a funny experience for everyone else watching him.

Friday arrives but Ranjeet's back is sprained badly and is restricted from moving around. Ranjeet knows that he will not be able to make it to the party but still decides to meet with Bharat to see how good or rather bad he is. Before Bharat arrives at Ranjeet's residence, Sheetal leaves after an altercation with Ranjeet. When Ranjeet asks Bharat to call his family doctor, he accidentally calls Ranjeet's girlfriend Suman Rao (Bhairavi Goswami). Ranjeet asks Bharat to leave his home for all the mess he has created. Ranjeet tries to get information regarding Sheetal's whereabout. Bharat offers to help and calls Sheetal's previous boyfriend Anant Ghoshal (Milind Soman) under a false identity. Instead, he ends up giving Ranjeet's Landline number that makes it obvious to Anant that Ranjeet is trying to get all details. Anant tells Ranjeet that Sheetal might have gone to Keval Arora, a sex-freak.

It turns out that a colleague of Bharat, Asif Merchant (Ranvir Shorey), who is also an inspector for the income tax department, knows the whereabouts of Keval. Asif is a snobby character who loves to watch cricket and is an ardent fan of Pakistan. While trying to mend the relationship between Ranjeet and Sheetal, Suman tells Bharat that he was called by Ranjeet to make a fool of him and have fun at his expense. This hurts Bharat, but the good-hearted Bharat still wants to help Ranjeet by letting Sheetal know how sorry Ranjeet is because of his acts and how much he loves her. However, he again messes up and the film ends on a funny note.

Bheja Fry 2 (2011)

Ajit Talwar (Kay Kay Menon) is a business tycoon. The movie starts with an interview of Ajit Talwar in a News Channel. Ajit Talwar has a broad business unit. Ajit Talwar is married to Naina Talwar (Rukshar) but still Ajit Talwar is a womanizer who has an affair with his secretary played by Spanta Patel (Kishwer Merchant). Ajit Talwar has a friend Kapoor (Rahul Vohra) whose wife Raveena (Aditi Govitrikar) runs a TV channel. Kapoor invites Ajit to the final episode of Aao Guess Karein, a TV Reality show aired on Kapoor's TV channel. The finalist of the show is the protagonist Bharat Bhushan (Vinay Pathak), who wins  25 Lakh and a chance to journey in a luxurious Cruise. The Executive Producer of the show Ranjini (Minissha Lamba) asks Bharat Bhushan, how would he use the prize money. Bhushan says by producing a music album.

Bhushan is an Income Tax Officer and has a friend M. T. Shekharan (Suresh Menon) who is also an Income Tax Officer. Shekharan calls on Bhushan for an Income Tax Raid. But Bhushan refuses saying that he is leaving for a holiday on a luxurious Cruise. Shekharan follows Ajit Talwar to the cruise ship and employs various disguises to collect evidence on Ajit Talwar. Ajit and Bhushan get lost in an island. Bhushan makes his way to the Cruise with all preparations and thus the hilarious journey begins.

Production of Bheja Fry 3 (TBA)

Bheja Fry 2 was a moderate success at the box office. Therefore, another sequel under the title Bheja Fry 3 begin filming and it will be the conclusion to the story of Bheja Fry trilogy. The sequel will feature return of Rajat Kapoor and Vinay Pathak reprising their roles as the main leads.

Cast and characters

Release and revenue

References

External links

2010s Hindi-language films
Indian film series
Comedy film series
2000s Hindi-language films